Lichuan railway station is a railway station in Lichuan City, Enshi Tujia and Miao Autonomous Prefecture,
Hubei Province of the People's Republic of China. It is an important junction point on the Huhanrong Passenger Dedicated Line, which crosses China from Shanghai on the east coast to Chongqing and Chengdu in the central province of Sichuan. Here the Yuli Railway (the branch from Lichuan to Chongqing) joins with the Yiwan Railway (the Yichang to Wanzhou section of the Huhanrong mainline).

Railway stations in Hubei